Valery Plotnikov (born 5 May 1950) is a Russian boxer. He competed in the men's featherweight event at the 1968 Summer Olympics.

References

External links
 

1950 births
Living people
Russian male boxers
Olympic boxers of the Soviet Union
Boxers at the 1968 Summer Olympics
People from Dzerzhinsk, Russia
Featherweight boxers
Sportspeople from Nizhny Novgorod Oblast